6 is the fourth album by the Norwegian avant-garde free improvisation electronic group Supersilent. The album was recorded live in the studio over the course of five days and has no overdubs. 6 is among the most acclaimed and well-known Supersilent releases.

Track listing
 "6.1" – 11:06
 "6.2" – 9:57
 "6.3" – 13:32
 "6.4" – 9:30
 "6.5" – 5:03
 "6.6" – 8:40

Vinyl track listing

Personnel
Arve Henriksen – vocals, trumpet, percussion
Helge Sten – live electronics, synthesizer, electric guitar
Ståle Storløkken – synthesizer
Jarle Vespestad – drums

Release history

References

External links
Rune Grammofon RLP 3029 – Supersilent: 6 
supersilent 6

2003 albums
Supersilent albums